Sufentanil, sold under the brand names Dsuvia and Sufenta, is a synthetic opioid analgesic drug approximately 5 to 10 times as potent as its parent drug, fentanyl, and 500 times as potent as morphine.  Structurally, sufentanil differs from fentanyl through the addition of a methoxymethyl group on the piperidine ring (which increases potency but is believed to reduce duration of action), and the replacement of the phenyl ring by thiophene. Sufentanil first was synthesized at Janssen Pharmaceutica in 1974.

Sufentanil is marketed for use by specialist centers under different trade names, such as Sufenta and Sufentil. Sufentanil with and without lidocaine or mepivacaine is available as a transdermal patch similar to Duragesic in Europe under trade names such as Chronogesic. It is available as a sublingual tablet under the trade name Dsuvia.

Medical uses
The main use of this medication is in operating suites and critical care where pain relief is required for a short period of time. It also offers properties of sedation and this makes it a good analgesic component of anesthetic regimen during an operation.

Because of its extremely high potency, it is often used in surgery and post-operative pain management for patients that are heavily opioid dependent/opioid tolerant because of long term opiate use for chronic pain or illicit opiate use.  Currently sufentanil is the most potent opioid painkiller available for use in humans.  Although more potent narcotic pain medications do exist, all medications stronger than sufentanil are approved for veterinary use only.  It is also used in surgery and post operative pain control in patients that are taking high dose buprenorphine for chronic pain because it is the only opioid that has a potency and binding affinity strong enough to displace buprenorphine from the opioid receptors in the central nervous system and provide analgesia.

In 2018, the Food and Drug Administration (FDA) approved Dsuvia, a sublingual tablet form of the drug, that was developed in a collaboration between AcelRx Pharmaceuticals and the United States Department of Defense for use in battlefield settings where intravenous (IV) treatments may not be readily available. The decision to approve this new potent synthetic opioid came under criticism from politicians and from the chair of the FDA advisory committee, who fear that the tablets will be easily diverted to the illegal drug market.

Side effects
It is essential for the administering medical professional to be trained in airway management with readily available airway equipment because the drug causes significant respiratory depression and may cause respiratory arrest if given too rapidly or in too high a dose. Other opioid side effects such as heart rhythm irregularity, blood pressure changes and nausea/vomiting can also be present in patients given this drug and should be dealt with accordingly.

Sufentanil has been associated with extremely rare instances of life-threatening anaphylaxis.

Overdose

Management
Because sufentanil is very potent, practitioners must be prepared to reverse the effects of the drug should the patient exhibit symptoms of overdose such as respiratory depression or respiratory arrest.  As for all other opioid-based medications, naloxone (trade name Narcan) is the definitive antidote for overdose.  Depending on the amount administered, it can reverse the respiratory depression and, if enough is administered, completely reverse the effects of sufentanil.

See also
 Betahydroxythiofentanyl
 Carfentanil
 R-30490
 Thiafentanil

References

External links 
 
 

Anilides
Belgian inventions
Ethers
Fentanyl
General anesthetics
Janssen Pharmaceutica
Mu-opioid receptor agonists
Opioids
Piperidines
Propionamides
Thiophenes